Anderson Marques de Oliveira (born 6 February 1983) is a Brazilian former professional footballer who played as a defender.

Club career

Early years
Born in Mogi das Cruzes, Anderson Marques came through the youth system of Portuguesa, while also spending some time at Grêmio. He made his senior debut with Barueri, before moving to Noroeste. In April 2009, Anderson Marques signed with São Caetano. He spent the following two years with the Azulão, having played over 100 competitive matches.

Partizan
In July 2011, Anderson Marques signed a three-year contract with Partizan, being given the number 44 shirt. He also rejoined his São Caetano teammate Eduardo Pacheco, who moved in the same direction during the previous month. However, only a few days later, Anderson Marques suffered an injury in training, causing him to miss the start of the season. He was eventually out of the first team upon recovery, since Nemanja Rnić and Ivan Ivanov formed the regular central defensive pairing under manager Aleksandar Stanojević.

Anderson Marques finally made his competitive debut for Partizan on 26 October 2011, playing the full 90 minutes in a 3–1 Serbian Cup win over Metalac Gornji Milanovac. He made his league debut for the club in a 3–0 home victory over Radnički Kragujevac on 3 December 2011, scoring a goal with a header after a corner kick. However, Anderson Marques failed to make any official appearance under new manager Avram Grant in the second part of the 2011–12 campaign, as the club won the league title.

Return to Brazil
After being released by Partizan, Anderson Marques returned to Brazil and signed with Audax São Paulo in August 2012. He moved to Ceará in May 2013, scoring twice from 16 appearances in the Campeonato Brasileiro Série B until the end of the year, as the club finished one point short of promotion to Série A. Subsequently, Anderson Marques joined Red Bull Brasil. He spent two years at the club, making his Campeonato Brasileiro Série D debut in 2015. In May 2016, Anderson Marques switched to Série C side Juventude. He helped them win promotion to Série B. In March 2017, Anderson Marques returned to his former club Red Bull Brasil. He became part of the Red Bull Bragantino squad when Red Bull Brasil merged with Clube Atlético Bragantino in April 2019.

Career statistics

Honours
Barueri
 Campeonato Paulista Série A2: 2006
 Campeonato Paulista Série A3: 2005
Partizan
 Serbian SuperLiga: 2011–12
Red Bull Bragantino
 Campeonato Brasileiro Série B: 2019

References

External links
 

Associação Desportiva São Caetano players
Association football defenders
Brazilian expatriate footballers
Brazilian expatriate sportspeople in Serbia
Brazilian footballers
Campeonato Brasileiro Série B players
Campeonato Brasileiro Série C players
Campeonato Brasileiro Série D players
Ceará Sporting Club players
Esporte Clube Juventude players
Esporte Clube Noroeste players
Expatriate footballers in Serbia
FK Partizan players
Grêmio Barueri Futebol players
Grêmio Osasco Audax Esporte Clube players
People from Mogi das Cruzes
Red Bull Bragantino players
Red Bull Brasil players
Serbian SuperLiga players
1983 births
Living people
Footballers from São Paulo (state)